The Etsakọ people are the majority ethnic group in the northern region of Edo State, Nigeria. They are historically linked to the ancient Benin kingdom. Administratively, they presently occupy three local government areas of Edo State these are; Etsako East, Etsako West and Etsako Central, with Agenebode, Auchi, and Fugar as their administrative headquarters respectively

The people of Owan are also known as Etsako. The Etsako,Owan, and Akoko-Edo people are often referred to as the Afenmai (Edo North), a land of warriors occupying the sprawling hills and valleys of Northern Edo state, that were derogatorily tagged Kukuruku people by the invading colonialist, in memory of the rallying "battle cry" code-sound of the people. Afenmai people have close linguistic and historical relationships. The local tradition of origin often traces their migration from Benin, which many oral traditionalists attribute probably to have happened around the 14th century BC. It is believed their ancestors settled in south Ibie before groups started moving to populate the other area they occupied like the Weppa Wanno lands, Okpella land, Uzaurue, etc.

Etsako is one of the three major ethnic groups in today's Edo State, and the most populous ethnic group in Edo North. The loyalty of an Etsako man firstly is to his home/homestead, Village, Clan, tribe, and ethnic group. Also strong affinity between the Etsako people and their neighbors can be deduced in some customary rites, borrowed words, and even migration pattern. A good example is the "Ajinebode" myth of the Idah Igala who believe that the early founder or ruler of Idah was "Ajinebode". This coincidence is worthy of further Historical elucidation since the mighty River Niger divides Idah in present-day Kogi State and Agenebode in Edo State.

Economy and Occupation
Etsako land is naturally endowed with arable farmlands, natural minerals, freshwater streams, and rivers including the Niger River, well distributed in every community across the vast plains, valleys, and hills, including mineral-rich mountains that decorate Etsako land. Naturally, Etsako people are traditionally engaged in crop and animal farming, fishery, hunting, and trading in the raw materials and by-products of the above industries. While many still engage in the traditional occupation of the people, industrialization and diversification have happened over many centuries. Today, Etsako people are prominently engaged in almost every known trade, occupation, and work in Nigeria and the world.

Etsako people are predominantly into farming with very fertile land that produces groundnut, yam, maize, Rice in a large wide range, and cassava. Mineral resources such as Coal, Limestone, Potassium, and Precious Stones of large commercial quantities are found in Etsako land and with beautiful landscapes and vegetation that can give tourism a wension. Compared to othersf Edo state, Security iEtsakoland is better, and the people greatly host visitors.

Estako people are one of the most vocal voices of political reason in Nigeria, and they are eminently known to lead social and political activism and people-oriented mass movements in colonial Nigeria to date.

Religion 
Atheism is a very rare identity among the Etsako people as they are culturally pro-theism from historical record till date. Today, the Etsako people practice traditional Spiritism, Christianity, and Islam. Oghena, Osinegba, Osi, and Oshio are the common words used to refer to God in different communities and dialects of the Etsako people.

Music
Etsako People are widely known for their Etsakor Music, with artists like Hon. Vincent Ugabi, Sir Alh. Waziri Oshoma, Late Gen. Bolivia Osigbeme, Late Madam Agbaobesi, Benji Igbadumhe, Renosi Momoh, Agbi Dance Groups of Weppa Wanno and Omoake Oshiomha a.k.a. (Omowinsone of Imiegba aincludedare the late Bolivia's son popularly known as Constantinopos Bolivia Osigbemhe (avi no pie), Ekpe Young, etc., that entertain a large number of Nigerians both in Edo & Delta States to Lagos, Kaduna, Kano and Abuja and the northern and Middle Beltern states of Nigeria in general.

Anwain

References

Ethnic groups in Nigeria
Edo State